Zizkaea is a monotypic genus of flowering plants belonging to the family Bromeliaceae. It only contains one known species, Zizkaea tuerckheimii.

It is native to the Dominican Republic and Haiti on the island of Hispaniola.

The genus name of Zizkaea is in honour of Georg Zizka (b. 1955), a German evolutionary botanist and also specialist in Bromeliaceae. The Latin specific epithet of tuerckheimii refers to Hans von Türckheim (1853-1920), a German plant collector.
Both the genus and the species were first described and published in Phytotaxa Vol.279 on page 55 in 2016.

References

Tillandsioideae
Monotypic Poales genera
Plants described in 2016
Flora of the Dominican Republic
Flora of Haiti
Flora without expected TNC conservation status